Isaiah 24 is the 24th chapter of the Book of Isaiah in the Hebrew Bible or the Old Testament of the Christian Bible. This book contains the prophecies attributed to the prophet Isaiah, and is one of the Books of the Prophets. Chapters 24-27 of Isaiah constitute one unit of prophecy sometimes called the "Isaiah Apocalypse". Chapter 24 contains the prophecy on the destruction of Judah for its defilements and transgressions, while a remnant will praise God, and God, by his judgments on his people and their enemies, will advance his kingdom.

Text 
The original text was written in Hebrew language. This chapter is divided into 23 verses.

Textual witnesses
Some early manuscripts containing the text of this chapter in Hebrew are of the Masoretic Text tradition, which includes the Codex Cairensis (895), the Petersburg Codex of the Prophets (916), Aleppo Codex (10th century), Codex Leningradensis (1008).

Fragments containing parts of this chapter were found among the Dead Sea Scrolls (3rd century BC or later):
 1QIsaa: complete
 1QIsab: extant: verses 18‑23
 4QIsab (4Q56): extant: verses 2
 4QIsac (4Q57): extant: verses 1‑15, 19‑23
 4QIsaf (4Q60): extant: verses 1‑3

There is also a translation into Koine Greek known as the Septuagint, made in the last few centuries BCE. Extant ancient manuscripts of the Septuagint version include Codex Vaticanus (B; B; 4th century), Codex Sinaiticus (S; BHK: S; 4th century), Codex Alexandrinus (A; A; 5th century) and Codex Marchalianus (Q; Q; 6th century).

Parashot
The parashah sections listed here are based on the Aleppo Codex. Isaiah 24 is a part of the Prophecies about Judah and Israel (Isaiah 24–35). {P}: open parashah; {S}: closed parashah.
 {P} 24:1-15 {S} 24:16-20 {S} 24:21-23 {P}

Verse 1
 Behold, the Lord maketh the earth empty, and maketh it waste,
 and turneth it upside down, and scattereth abroad the inhabitants thereof. "Empty" (Hebrew: בוקק ; also written בקק): in the sense of "poured out from a vessel". The Arabic parallel has an onomatopoetic sound of water flowing, emptied out from a bottle or "gurgling noise" from that action.Gesenius, H. W. F. Gesenius' Hebrew and Chaldee Lexicon to the Old Testament Scriptures: Numerically Coded to Strong's Exhaustive Concordance, with an English Index. Samuel Prideaux Tregelles (Translator). Baker Book House; 7th edition. 1979. בקק 
 "Waste" (Hebrew: בולק ; also written בלק; Assyrian: balâ‡u''): "laid waste" or "devastated". The Arabic parallel means "a desert"; also a form of onomatopoeia, to "void" or "drain away" a bottle of its content; similar to the word that means "empty".

See also
Jerusalem
Mount Zion
Related Bible parts: Isaiah 1, Isaiah 5, Isaiah 9, Isaiah 10, Isaiah 29, Isaiah 30, Zechariah 5, Matthew 24, 1 Thessalonians 5, 2 Thessalonians 2, Revelation 6, Revelation 8, Revelation 15, Revelation 18, Revelation 19

References

Bibliography

External links

Jewish
Isaiah 24 Masoretic Text (Hebrew) with Parallel English

Christian
Isaiah 24 English Translation with Parallel Latin Vulgate

24